is a Japanese television jidaigeki or period drama that was broadcast in 1979. It is based on Jirō Osaragi's novel of the same title. It depicts the story of the revenge of the forty-seven rōnin of Ako against Lord Kira from Hotta Hayato's point of view. Kaneto Shindo was in charge of the script for several episodes.

Plot
Set in the eighteenth century, during the reign of the fifth Tokugawa shōgun Tokugawa Tsunayoshi.  Akō-han is demolished by the Tokugawa shogunate. Hotta Hayato is a ronin who is living a desperate life because of his sad past. But one day he starts working for Chisaka Takafusa, the Chief retainer(Karō) of the Uesugi clan. The Uesugi clan and Chisaka are wary of Ōishi Kuranosuke and Ako Roshi's movements, so Chisaka orders Hotta to observe Ōishi Kuranosuke. But Hotta gradually comes to like the personality of Ōishi and even helps Ōishi.

Cast

Starring role 

 Yorozuya Kinnosuke as Ōishi Kuranosuke
 Masakazu Tamura as Hotta Hayato

Asano Clan/ Akō Rōshi 
 Keiko Matsuzaka as Aguri
 Kyōko Kishida as Ōishi Riku
 Ken Matsudaira as Asano Takumi no Kami
 Kohji Moritsugu as Maehara Isuke
 Goro Ibuki as Horibe Yasubei
 Ryosuke Kagawa as Horibe Yahei
 Kazuo Kitamura as Ōno Kurobei
 Genji Kawai as Okuda Magodayou
 Rantaro Mine as Hazama Shinroku
 Shunya Wazaki as Kataoka Gengoemon
 Kō Nishimura as Onodera Jyounai
 Nobuo Kawai as Fujii Mataemon
Ken Nishida as Shindo Toshimoto
 Akiji Kobayashi as Hara Sōemon

Uesugi Clan/Kira Clan 
 So Yamamura as Chisaka Takafusa
 Eitaro Ozawa as Kira Kōzuke no suke
 Rokkō Toura as Matsubara
 Yūki Meguro as Uesugi Noritsuna
 Yūsuke Kawazu as Kobayashi Haihichi

Tokugawa Shogunate 
 Katsuo Nakamura as Tokugawa Tsunayoshi
 Mikio Narita as Yanagisawa Yoshiyasu
 Shinsuke Mikimoto as Araki Jūzaemon
 Shigeru Amachi as Wakizaka Awaji no kami
 Toshiro Mifune as Tachibana Sakon (special appearance)

Others 
 Shingo Yamashiro as Maruoka
 Junko Miyashita as Ochika
 Katsumasa Uchida as Iizawa Shinnosuke
 Nenji Kobayashi as Iwase Kageyu
 Mie Nakao
 Yūsuke Takita
 Ryunosuke Kaneda as Ryukō
 Yutaka Nakajima as Oen
 Isamu Nagato as Kumo no Bunjyuro
 Jun Hamamura as Hozumi Sōzaemon
 Yoshio Inaba as Nakajima Gorosaku
 Hiroki Matsukata as Tsuchiya Chikara (special appearance)
 Mayumi Ogawa as Yougiri Dayou (special appearance)

Episodes

1,Hana no Ame 花の雨
2,Toshou Matsu no Dairōka 刃傷 松の大廊下
3,Hiruandon to Neko Hiyōbu 昼行燈と猫兵部
4,Jorō Gumo 女郎蜘蛛
5,Fuuno Midareru Akō Jō 風雲乱れる赤穂城
6,Hokoritakaki Bushi 誇り高き武士
7,Antō 暗闘
8,Missho 密書
9.Ketsudan 決断
10,Haru no Arashi 春の嵐
11,Kuranosuke Anstsu 内蔵助暗殺
12,Ippatsu no Jūsei 一発の銃声
13,Shiro Akewatashi 城明け渡し
14,Matatabi またたび
15,Bōenkyō 遠眼鏡
16,Yugao no Onna 夕顔の女
17,Kinjirareta Koi 禁じられた恋
18,Semi Shigure 蝉しぐれ
19,Hiren no Omoji 悲恋の大文字
20,Hotarubi 螢火
21,Twuioku no Aki 追憶の秋
22,Kuranosuke Edoe 内蔵助 江戸へ
23,Saikai 再会
24,Jōen
25,Kiratei wo Sagure
26,Yamashina no Wakare
27,Hahato Ko Higan no katami
28,Adauchi eno Kadode
29,Datsuraku suru Seishun
30,Oishi Azumakudari
31,Hissi no Kōbō
32,Shukume no Shitō
33,Uchiiri Zenya 討入り前夜
34,Iza! Uchiiri いざ! 討入り
35,Akatsuki no Gaisen 暁の凱旋
36,Genroku Bushidō 元禄武士道

References

1979 Japanese television series debuts
1970s drama television series
Jidaigeki television series
Television shows based on Japanese novels
Television series set in the 17th century